Adams Township is one of the eighteen townships of Monroe County, Ohio, United States.  The population was 625 at the 2010 census.

Geography
Located in the northeastern part of the county, it borders the following townships:
Sunsbury Township - north
Switzerland Township - northeast
Salem Township - east
Green Township - south
Center Township - west

No municipalities are located in Adams Township, although the unincorporated community of Cameron lies in the township's east.

Name and history
It is one of ten Adams Townships statewide.

Government
The township is governed by a three-member board of trustees, who are elected in November of odd-numbered years to a four-year term beginning on the following January 1. Two are elected in the year after the presidential election and one is elected in the year before it. There is also an elected township fiscal officer, who serves a four-year term beginning on April 1 of the year after the election, which is held in November of the year before the presidential election. Vacancies in the fiscal officership or on the board of trustees are filled by the remaining trustees.

References

External links
County website

Townships in Monroe County, Ohio
Townships in Ohio